The 2015 Holiday Bowl was an American college football bowl game played on December 30, 2015 at Qualcomm Stadium in San Diego, California.  The 38th edition of the Holiday Bowl, it featured Wisconsin from the Big Ten Conference and USC from the Pac-12 Conference.  It was one of the 2015–16 bowl games that concluded the 2015 FBS football season. The game started at 7:40 p.m. PST and was telecast on ESPN (also on ESPN Radio). The Badgers defeated the Trojans 23–21.

Teams
This was the seventh overall meeting between these two teams, with USC leading the series 6–0 before this game. The last time these two teams met was in 1966 when #5 USC defeated the unranked Badgers 38–3 in a regular season non-conference game.

Wisconsin

USC

Game summary

Scoring Summary

Source:

Statistics

References

Holiday Bowl
Holiday Bowl
Wisconsin Badgers football bowl games
USC Trojans football bowl games
Holiday Bowl
December 2015 sports events in the United States